Sarath Kothalawala (:si:සරත් කොතලාවල) [Sinhala]) is an actor, director, producer and a screenplay writer in Sri Lankan cinema.  He, along with Kumara Thirimadura, won the Award for the Best Screenplay at Derana Lux Film Awards in 2014 for Thanha Rathi Ranga movie.

Personal life
His father was a businessman and mother worked as a rubber collector in a rubber estate. He is married to Pushpa Samanmali, and they have one daughter Isuri Sandeepani and a son Isuru Manusha.

Career
Kothalawala first appeared in Street theatre Diriya Kadella directed by Jayalal Rohana. While performed in the drama, he met Shelton Payagala, who was his teacher and guided him towards stage dramas and other theatre works, as he said. He took 15 years to study aspects of drama.

Kothalawala has acted in about 80 stage plays, where he also directed many stage plays. His most popular stage plays include Sookarayek Samaga, Nari Burathi, Gabbara Minisa Gutikamata Niyamithai Mandela Mandela, Eaka Sakkuwe, Ko Kukko, Jayasirita Pissu and Charithe Horu Aran.

Kothalawala started his film career with Padadaya back in 1998, directed by Linton Semage. Through that, he performed many dramatic roles he is also performed some comedy roles as well. Apart from acting, he was the  screenplay writer of film Thanha Rathi Ranga. The role in this film highly praised by the critics and was a commercial hit as well. His first cinema direction came through News Paper co-directed with Kumara Thirimadura was released on 29 June 2020.

Awards
 Best Actor – Thanha Rathi Raga - 3rd Derana Lux Film Award - 2014
 Best Screenplay Writer – Thanha Rathi Raga - 3rd Derana Lux Film Award - 2014
 Best Actor – Thanha Rathi Raga - Hiru Golden Film Awards - 2016
 Jury Award - Grahambell Wath Sithuwada - Sumathi Awards - 2017
 Merit Award - Grahambell Wath Sithuwada - Raigam Tele'es - 2017

Television serials

 Ahas Pawwa
 Aparna
 Awasarai Piyabanna
 Baddata Saha Kuliyata
 Batti
 Chandi Kumarihami 
 Deweni Yuddhaya
 Dhawala Kadulla 
 Doowili Mal
 Ehipillamak Yata  
 Gaga Laga Gedara
 Googly
 Handapana 
 Helankada
 Herda Sakshiya
 Hima Varusa 
 Hitha Langa Hinehuna
 Idorayaka Mal Pipila
 Internasanal 1 & 2 
 Ithin Eta Passe
 Jeewithaya Horu Aran 
 Kampitha Vil
 Kapa Nasna Samaya
 Kethumathi Neyo 
 Kunu Damima Thahanam
 Manikkawatha 
 Massa
 Mati Kadulu 
 Mini Kirana
 Monarathenna
 Pork Veediya 
 Parasathu Mal
 Rankiri Amma
 Ran Sevaneli
 Rathi Virathi 
 Ridee Siththam
 Sadisi Tharanaya 
 Sanda Dev Diyani 
 Sanda Thaniyama
 Sansararanya Asabada
 Satya 
 Sedona
 Sihinayak Wage 
 Sihini
 Sikuru Wasanthe 
 Theertha Tharanaya
 Three-wheel Malli 
 Vinivindimi
 Vishwanthari 
 Wara Peraliya 
 Warna 
 Wasuli Kanda

Filmography

References

External links
Posts Tagged ‘Sarath kothalawala’
Adaraneeya Tharuwak with Sarath Kothalawala
පරක්කු වී ආ කුමාරට දඬුවමක්
තිරිමාදුර-කොතලාවල එක්ව හැදූ 'ද නිවුස් පේපර්'
අම්මා නොවෙයි බුදු වන්නේ නුඹයි පුතේ නන්දා - සුනිල් - ගයත්‍රි ගැන ජැක්සන් ඇන්තනී කියන ආන්දෝලනාත්මක කතාව

Sri Lankan male film actors
Sinhalese male actors
Living people
Year of birth missing (living people)
Sri Lankan comedians
Sri Lankan film directors